This is a list of episodes of Full Frontal with Samantha Bee, an American late-night talk show and news satire program. The series premiered on TBS on February 8, 2016.

Series overview

Episodes

Season 1 (2016–17)

Season 2 (2017–18)

Season 3 (2018–19)

Season 4 (2019–20)

Season 5 (2020)
Season 5 was affected by the COVID-19 pandemic. Starting with the 25 March 2020 episode, filming was done outside of the studio, without an audience, in the woods near Samantha Bee's home, with her husband Jason Jones as her cameraman and additional voices, and her family as the filming crew. These episodes were called "Little Show in the Big Woods", having been filmed in the woods outside her home.

Season 6 (2021)

Season 7 (2022)

See also
Not the White House Correspondents’ Dinner

Notes

References

External links
 
 

Full Frontal with Samantha Bee
Lists of American comedy television series episodes
Lists of American non-fiction television series episodes